Jocko Sims (born February 20, 1981) is an American actor, known for playing Anthony Adams in Crash and later playing Carlton Burk in the series The Last Ship. On the NBC TV show New Amsterdam, he portrayed Dr. Floyd Reynolds.

Career

Movie roles 
In 2005, he appeared as Julius in Jarhead.

In 2008, he starred in Leon Lazano's award-winning film Something Is Killing Tate.

In 2014, He also appeared in the film Dawn of the Planet of the Apes, where he played Werner, the radio operator of the colony.

Television roles 
In 2004, he appeared as a guest in an episode of Cold Case as Lionel Royce, the leader of the "Black Liberation Front" section in Philadelphia in 1969.

In 2008, he joined the main cast of Crash, in which he played Anthony Adams, the music prodigy to Dennis Hopper's character Ben Cenders, until the end of the series in 2009. His portrayal of Anthony Adams, a chauffeur and aspiring hip-hop artist, led to the iTunes release of "Head Up," a song that is performed by Sims in the third episode of the series.

In 2010, he appeared as a guest on Criminal Minds, where he played Tony Torrell, the former landlord and victim of serial killer Kaman Scott (Leonard Roberts).

In 2012, he played Michael Thomas, the brother-in-law of NCIS director Leon Vance, in the series NCIS.

In 2014, he joined the recurring cast of the second season of the series Masters of Sex where he played Robert Franklin, brother of Coral (Keke Palmer) and a civil rights activist.  That same year he joined the recurring cast of The Last Ship, where he plays Lieutenant Carlton Burk, the head of Team VBSS of the USS Nathan James. During the second season, he became a main character.

In 2016, Sims joined the cast of I'm Dying Up Here, a dark comedy produced by Jim Carrey. He also shot for the seasons 4 and 5 of The Last Ship.

In March 2018, Sims was cast in the role of Dr. Floyd Reynolds on the NBC medical drama New Amsterdam. The same year, he also appeared as Dr. Ben Wilmot in the Fox medical drama The Resident.

Filmography

Film

Television

References

External links

Living people
1981 births
African-American male actors
American male television actors
Place of birth missing (living people)
American male film actors
University of California, Los Angeles alumni
21st-century African-American people
20th-century African-American people